The Bishop of Doncaster is an episcopal title used by a suffragan bishop of the Church of England Diocese of Sheffield, in the Province of York, England. The title takes its name after the town of Doncaster in South Yorkshire; the See was erected under the Suffragans Nomination Act 1888 by Order in Council dated 4 February 1972. The See is currently held by the Right Reverend Sophie Jelley.

List of bishops

References

External links
 Crockford's Clerical Directory - Listings

 
Diocese of Sheffield
Doncaster